Aristos Aristokleous (born February 28, 1974) is a Cypriot former international football defender.

He started his career in 1990 with APOEL and he spent most of his career with APOEL where he played for eleven years. Then, he joined another team of Nicosia, Olympiakos for two years. Also, he played for AEK Larnaca for another two years and finally finished his career by playing for two seasons for ENTHOI Lakatamia.

Honours
AEK Larnaca
 Cypriot Cup: 2003–04

References

External links
 

1974 births
Living people
APOEL FC players
Olympiakos Nicosia players
AEK Larnaca FC players
ENTHOI Lakatamia FC players
Cypriot footballers
Cyprus international footballers
Greek Cypriot people
Association football defenders